Miloš Borisov (born 3 September 1985) is a Montenegrin professional basketball player for Kecskeméti TE of the Hungarian first division.

External links
 Miloš Borisov at aba-liga.com
 Miloš Borisov at legabasket.it
 Miloš Borisov at euroleague.net

1985 births
Living people
ABA League players
Basketball League of Serbia players
Debreceni EAC (basketball) players
Falco KC Szombathely players
KK Hemofarm players
KK Radnički Kragujevac (2009–2014) players
KK Vojvodina Srbijagas players
Montenegrin expatriate basketball people in Hungary
Montenegrin expatriate basketball people in Serbia
Montenegrin expatriate basketball people in Italy
Montenegrin men's basketball players
OKK Beograd players
People from Bijelo Polje
Small forwards
Soproni KC players
Szolnoki Olaj KK players
Teramo Basket players